Khoon Ki Takkar is a 1981 Hindi-language action drama film directed by Harish Chawla and produced by P. K. Sharma and Surinder Mohan. The film stars Vinod Mehra, Mahendra Sandhu, and Zarina Wahab in lead roles. This film was released under the banner of Golden Star Movies. Music direction was done by Sonik Omi.

Plot
Rajan, the son of Thakur Pratap Singh, loves Rajjo, a nurse in a hospital. Thakur Pratap Singh, a landlord, opposes their relationship. Rajan learns that his stepbrother Sheroo is also in love with Rajjo. So he decides to sacrifice his love.

Cast
 Vinod Mehra as Rajan
 Mahendra Sandhu as Sheroo
 Zarina Wahab as Rajjo
 Neeta Mehta as Sapna
 Ranjeet as Goga
 Om Shivpuri as Thakur Pratap Singh
 Manmohan Krishna as Rahim Chacha
 Chand Usmani as Shakuntala
 Sudha Shivpuri as Shanti

Soundtrack 
Music direction of the film was done by Sonik Omi and lead singers of this film were Mohammed Rafi, Asha Bhosle, Amit Kumar, Aarti Mukherjee and Chandrani Mukherjee.

References

External links
 

1981 films
1980s action drama films
1980s Hindi-language films
Indian action drama films